"I Got a Feeling" is a song written by Baker Knight and performed by Ricky Nelson. The song reached #10 on the Billboard Hot 100 and #27 in the UK in 1958.

The song is ranked #67 on Billboard magazine's Top 100 songs of 1958.

References

1958 songs
1958 singles
Songs written by Baker Knight
Ricky Nelson songs
Imperial Records singles